Small Voices or Mga Munting Tinig is a 2002 Filipino drama film directed by Gil Portes and Adolfo Alix, Jr. The film set in a public school won 11 awards and was nominated for 11 other including Gawad Urian Awards. It is the only Filipino film to be released by Warner Bros. Pictures.

Plot
Melinda (Alessandra de Rossi) is a new substitute teacher at the Malawig Elementary School, located in a poor remote barrio. A young university graduate, her family expects her to look for work abroad, but in her idealism she takes on a challenging job in the provincial public school, which lacks resources and has corrupt personnel. The heavy monsoon rains and the nearby NPAs also add to her difficulties.

Melinda goes about her work with daily diligence though, always having a smile, a kind word for her neatly uniformed charges. But her battles against apathy, corruption, and contempt are constant, further hindered by the volatile political climate in which fathers and sons are constantly recruited to join guerilla forces fighting in the mountains.

When a funding opportunity in the form of a regional singing contest presents itself to Melinda, the idealistic teacher must smartly juggle uncooperative school administrators, confrontational parents, and the torn children themselves in order to let their small voices be heard.

Cast
Alessandra de Rossi as Melinda
Dexter Doria as Mrs. Pantalan
Gina Alajar as Chayong
Amy Austria as Luz
Bryan Homecillo as Popoy
Pierro Rodriguez III as Obet
Irma Adlawan as Fe
Keno Agaro as Adong
AJ Delos Santos as Carlos
Sining Blanco as Gela
Noni Buencamino as Fidel
Malou Crisologo as Solita
Hazel Logan as Ida
Christian Galindo as Lino
Nanding Josef as Adong's Father
Tony Mabesa as Mr. Tibayan
Lailani Navarro as Pilar
Jessie Diaz as Bugoy 1
James Alvaro as Bugoy 2
Rowell Reyes as Ato
Alchris Galura
Celina Suntay as Malawig choir kids
Jocel Escobal as Malawig choir kids
Myko Suntay as Malawig choir kids
Jelly Cruz as Malawig choir kids
Gemma Gonzales as Malawig choir kids
Shamaine Centenera (now Shamaine Buencamino) as Adong's Mom
Connie Chua as Gela's Mom
Aleth dela Cruz as Ida's Mom
Hamid Eton as Mr. Singh
Tessie Villarama as Teacher/Emcee
Jess Evardone as Melinda's Dad
Jo Kristi Payet as Young Melinda
Rey Mendoza as Adong's Brother
Jasper Vinarao as Adong's Brother
Bong Rodriguez as Ka Andres/NPA 1
Jun Galindo as NPA 2
Dr. Ramon Pedro P. Paterno as Central School Supervisor
Menchu Suntay as Central School Supervisor
Jenny Cruz as Central School Supervisor
Luisa Logan as Pondahan Vendor
Cesar Paz as Central School Guard
Vic Buenaflor as Jeepney Driver
Joy Marfil as Coach, Rizal Parochial School
Jerome Rico as Malawig Choir Guitarist
Myka del Castillo as Choir Soloist 1
Anthony Verzosa as Rizal Choir Soloist
Bobby Suntay as Choral Competition Judge
Grace Suntay as Choral Competition Judge
Pieth Suntay as Choral Competition Judge
Malon Tinana as Choral Competition Judge
Elma Agaro
Helen Bahunsua
Gema Blanco
Gina Diaz
Olive Gonzales
Susan de los Santos
Ruben Monsano
Gloria Reyes
Morris Reyes
Fe Terrado
Manny de los Santos

Critical reception
Small Voices  holds a 61% approval rating on review aggregator website Rotten Tomatoes, based on 28 reviews, with a weighted average of 5.5/10. It garnered a score of 58/100 on review aggregator website Metacritic based on 9 reviews.

References

External links
 

2002 films
2000s Tagalog-language films
2002 drama films
Philippine New Wave
Warner Bros. films
Films directed by Gil Portes